Exploratorium is a 1974 American short documentary film about the Exploratorium science museum in San Francisco, produced by Jon Boorstin. The film explores the museum through imagery and sound, without voice-over. It was nominated for an Academy Award for Best Documentary Short Subject. The film was preserved by the Academy Film Archive in 2013.

See also
 List of American films of 1974

References

External links

 Watch Exploratorium at the Exploratorium website.

1974 films
1974 documentary films
1974 short films
American short documentary films
Documentary films about science
Documentary films about San Francisco
Films set in museums
1970s short documentary films
1970s English-language films
1970s American films